Taimane Tauiliili Bobby Gardner (born February 13, 1989) is an American ukulele virtuoso and composer. In 2019, she won a Nā Hōkū Hanohano award, for Favorite Entertainer of the Year. In 2019, Taimane Gardner's song, Water, from her album, Elemental was nominated for Instrumental Composition of the Year by Nā Hoku Hanohano Awards.

Early life
Gardner was born in Honolulu, Hawaii, to Jack and Elva Gardner, and is of Samoan, German, Irish, French, and Swedish descent. Her name translates to diamond in the Samoan language. Gardner began playing the ukulele at the age of 5 and attended Roy Sakuma’s ukulele school. She was discovered by legendary musician Don Ho at age 13 and also studied under Jake Shimabukuro as a teenager. She graduated from the Honolulu Waldorf School before attending Kapiolani Community College.

Career
Taimane became a popular local musician on the Waikiki performance circuit as a teenager. In 2005, she released her first album Loco Princess. Her album Life – The Art & Beauty of Being Human was released in 2008. Other released solo projects include Ukulele Dance in 2012, We Are Made of Stars in 2015, Elemental in 2018 and Hawaiki (2022).

Taimane has performed internationally in Japan and Hong Kong. Her album We Are Made of Stars was nominated for Ukulele Album of the Year at the 2016 Na Hoku Hanohano Awards. Taimane has also been recognized for her cover medley performances, including a spot on the Guitar World Magazine Top 10 Ukulele Moments list. On March 13, 2020, Taimane had an NPR Tiny Desk concert with over 1 million views.

Discography
Albums
 Loco Princess (2005)
 Life – The Art & Beauty of Being Human (2008)
 Ukulele Dance (2012)
 We Are Made of Stars (2015)
 Elemental (2018)
 Hawaiki (2022)

References

External links
 Official Website
 
 

1989 births
Living people
American people of Samoan descent
Hawaiian ukulele players
21st-century American composers
American women composers
Musicians from Hawaii
21st-century American women musicians
21st-century women composers
Na Hoku Hanohano Award winners
Mountain Apple Company artists